Redfield may refer to:

People
Redfield (surname)

Places
United Kingdom
Redfield, Bristol, an area within the City of Bristol
United States

Mount Redfield, a mountain in Essex County, New York
Redfield, Arkansas, a small city in northwestern Jefferson County
Redfield, Iowa, a city in Dallas County
Redfield, Kansas, a city in Bourbon County
Redfield, New York, a town in Oswego County
Redfield, South Dakota, a city in and the county seat of Spink County
Redfield, Texas, a census-designated place in Nacogdoches County
Redfield School Historic District, a former school and historic district in Redfield, Arkansas
Redfield Township, Spink County, South Dakota, a township in Spink County, South Dakota
Redfield & West Streets Historic District, a street and historic district in New Haven, Connecticut

Structures
Redfield (Oak Level, Virginia), a house in Halifax County, Virginia, United States

Art and entertainment 
Redfield Records, an independent record label in Melle, Germany

Other uses
Redfield ratio, the atomic ratio of carbon, nitrogen and phosphorus found in phytoplankton and throughout the deep oceans
Redfieldia, a monotypic genus in the grass family (Poaceae)

See also
Redfield College (disambiguation)
Justice Redfield (disambiguation)